The following is a list of songs produced, co-produced and remixed by American record producer, Drumma Boy.

Production credits

2002
Tela - Double Dose
 05. "Tennessee Titans" (Feat. Yo Gotti, Haystak, Gangsta Boo & Project Playaz)
 09. "Wangin'" (Feat. Lo Key, Papa Rue & StreetBoy)
 14. "Strive"

2003
Gangsta Boo - Enquiring Minds II: The Soap Opera
 02. "Sippin & Spinnin (Remix)" (feat. Bun B & Playa Fly)
 05. "City Streets"
 00. "Frenemies"
 00. "Fuck Boy" (feat. Rich Boy)

2005
Boyz n da Hood - Boyz n da Hood
 "Look"
 "Trap Niggaz"

Young Jeezy - Let's Get It: Thug Motivation 101
 02. "Standing Ovation"

2006
DJ Drama & Young Jeezy - You Can't Ban The Snowman
 "Ya Dig"

Lil Scrappy - Bred 2 Die Born 2 Live
 16. "Like Me"

Pastor Troy - Stay Tru
 "Police Can't Break It Up"

Pastor Troy - By Choice or By Force
 "I Represent This (Can I Get a Witness)"
 "Drop That Ass"
 "Partner In Crime" (feat. Misha)

Yo Gotti - Back 2 Da Basics
 01. "Thats Whats Up (Intro)"
 16. "Warrior"

Young Jeezy - The Inspiration
 08. "The Realest"

2007
Boyz n da Hood - Back Up n da Chevy
 "Paper" (feat. Rick Ross)

DJ Drama - Gangsta Grillz: The Album
 "Gangsta Grillz" (feat. Lil Jon)
 "187" (feat. Project Pat, B.G. & 8 Ball & MJG)

Gorilla Zoe - Welcome to the Zoo
 01. "Do Something"
 05. "Crack Muzik (This That Muzik)" (feat. Jody Breeze)
 11. "Juice Box" (feat. Yung Joc)
 14. "Lil Shawty"

Paul Wall - Get Money, Stay True
 11. "Gimme That"

Pastor Troy - Tool Muziq
 14. "Will He Come Home Tonight?"

Playaz Circle - Supply & Demand
 06. "We Workin'"

Scarface - Made
 02. "Never"

U.S.D.A - Cold Summer
 02. "White Girl"
 08. "Quickie"
 14. "Go Getta (Remix)" (feat. R. Kelly, Jadakiss & Bun B)

Yung Joc - Hustlenomics
 "Livin' the Life" (feat. Southern Girl)

2008
Young Jeezy - The Recession
 06. "Amazin"
 07. "Hustlaz Ambition"
 16. "Put On" (feat. Kanye West)

T.I. - Paper Trail
 03. "Ready for Whatever"
 08. "My Life Your Entertainment" (Feat. Usher)
 11. "What Up, What's Haapnin"
 15. "You Ain't Missin' Nothing"

Ace Hood - Gutta
 "Get 'Em Up"

Blood Raw - My Life: The True Testimony
 "It Feels Good"

Diamond
 "Yeah" (feat. Rocko & Teairra Marí)

E-40 - The Ball Street Journal 13. "Hood Boy"

Gucci Mane - The Movie "Gangsta Movie"
 "Add It Up"
 "Im A Star"
 "You Know What It Is"
 "Georgia"
 "Photoshoot"
 "Bachelor Pad"
 "Money Tall"
 "Lost My Mind"
 "Show Me"
 "Hot Stuff"
 "Top of The World"

Lil Scrappy
 "I Would Never Quit" (feat. LeToya Luckett)

Plies - Definition of Real 01. "I'm Da Man" (feat. Trey Songz)
 08. "Watch Dis"

Plies - Da REAList 05. "Plenty Money"
 13. "I Chase Paper"

Rick Ross - Trilla 06. "Money Make Me Come" (feat. EbonyLove)
 10. "Here I Am" (feat. Nelly & Avery Storm)

Rocko - Self-Made 02. "Umma Do Me"
 04. "Busy"
 05. "Tomorrow"
 06. "Old Skool"
 08. "Like This Here"
 11. "Snakes"
 12. "Meal"
 13. "Thugs Need Love Too" (feat. Monica)
 00. "Trap Party"
 00. "Yeen Talkin Bout Nothin'"
 00. "Ball Out" (feat. Kristyle)

Sophia Fresh - So Phreakin' Fresh "Drop It"

Soulja Boy Tell 'Em - iSouljaBoyTellEm 01. "I'm Bout Tha Stax (Intro)"
 08. "Rubber Bands"
 16. "I Pray (Outro)"

2009Birdman - Pricele$$ "Money To Blow" (feat. Drake & Lil Wayne)Bow Wow - New Jack City II "Pole In My Basement"Jay Sean - All or Nothing 3. "Down" (feat. Lil Wayne)Diamond - The Black Barbie "Massaratti" (feat. Dorrough)
 "Role Model" (feat. Nicole Wray)DJ Drama - Gangsta Grillz 2: The Album 05. "Day Dreamin'" (feat. Akon, Snoop Dogg & T.I.)
 13. "Gotta Get It" (feat. B.G., Juvenile & Soulja Slim)

Gangsta Boo & DJ Drama - The Rumors 04. "We Did Dat" (featuring Gucci Mane)
 05. "Booty Switch" (featuring Shawnna)
 06. "Posse Song" (featuring Drum Squad)
 10. "Bitch Don't Look At Me" (featuring Lachat)
 12. "Call Me" (featuring J-Bar)
 13. "M.E.M.P.H.I.S." (featuring Crunchy Black, 8Ball & MJG & Raw Talent)
 14. "Blow It Out" (featuring Kristyle)
 15. "Laughen At Em"
 17. "Necessary"Gorilla Zoe - Don't Feed Da Animals 04. "Lost"
 09. "I Got It" (feat. Big Block)
 14. "Echo"

Gucci Mane - The Movie Part 2 (The Sequel) "Pressure"
 "Burr"
 "Gucci"
 "Overboard"
 "Awesome"
 "Ain't Nothing Else To Do"

Gucci Mane - Burrrprint: 3D (The Movie: Part 3) 04. "Watch Cost A Bentley" (feat. Bun B & Rocko)
 07. "Yelp, I Got All Of That"
 09. "My Shadow"
 13. "More" (feat. Kandi and Sean Ceasar)

Gucci Mane - The Cold War: Part 1 (Guccimerica) "Follow Me"
 "Boiy"
 "Party Animal" (feat. Snoop Dogg)

Gucci Mane - Wasted: The Prequel "Photo Shoot"

Gucci Mane - The State vs. Radric Davis 01. "Classical (Intro)"
 05. "All About the Money" (feat. Rick Ross)
 17. "Kush Is My Cologne" (feat. Bun B, Devin the Dude & E-40)
 18. "Worst Enemy"

Juicy J & Project Pat - Cut Throat "Take Whats Comin Wit It"

Juice
 "Crush My Cool" (feat. Bun B)

Rick Ross - Deeper Than Rap 12. "Face" (feat. Trina)

Triple C's - Custom Cars & Cycles 06. "Trickn Off" (feat. Gucci Mane)
 15. "Yams Pt. 2" (feat. Yo Gotti)

Young Buck - Only God Can Judge Me 02. "Without Me" (featuring 8 Ball & MJG)

Yung Joc - Mr. Robinson's Neighborhood "All Dat Ass" (feat. Wale & Young Dose)
 "What's Really Good"
 "Watch Me Make A Movie" (feat. DJ Khaled)

2010
2 Chainz - Trap-A-Velli 2: (The Residue) "Check Me Out"
 "Boo" (feat. Yo Gotti)
 "Issues" (ft. Young Buck)
 "Been Hustlin"
 "Doin Me Daily" (ft.  Cap 1)
 "Between Me & You (ft. Lil Keke & Gudda Gudda)

8 Ball & MJG - Ten Toes Down "Ten Toes Down"
 "It's Goin' Down"
 "Life Goes On" (feat. Slim Thug)
 "Still Will Remain"Bun B - Trill OG "Just Like That" (feat. Young Jeezy)DJ Drama & OJ Da Juiceman - O.R.A.N.G.E. "When I Get Big"
 "Touchdown"
 "Party Started"DJ Paul - Too Kill Again "Stick Em Up" (feat. DJ Zirk)Dorrough - Get Big "Hood Bitch" (feat. Yo Gotti & Gorilla Zoe)

Giggs - Let Em Ave It 06. "Get Your Money Up"Gorilla Zoe - I Am Atlanta 3 "Body Bag"

Gucci Mane  - The Appeal: Georgia's Most Wanted 04. "What It's Gonna Be"
 14. "Weirdo"

Gucci Mane - Burrrprint (2) HD02. "Intro Live From Fulton County Jail HD"
04. "Boy From The Block"
07. "Gucci On The Rise"
10. "Everybody Looking"
12. "Coca Coca" (feat. Rocko, OJ Da Juiceman, Waka Flocka Flame, Shawty Lo, Yo Gotti & Nicki Minaj)
14. "Here We Go Again"
16. "Antisocial" (feat. Mylah)
17. "Beat It Up" (feat. Trey Songz)
19. "911 Emergency"
23. "I'm So Tired Of You"
24. "Outro Live From Fulton County Jail HD"

Gucci Mane - Mr. Zone 6 "Normal"
 "Dats My Life"
 "Stove Music" (feat. Waka Flocka Flame)

Gucci Mane - Jewelry Selection "Cleopatra"
 "Gross"
 "Stone Cold"
 "Don't Believe Me"

Gucci Mane - Ferrari Music "Late'
 "Better Baby"
 "No Hands (Remix) feat. Waka Flocka Flame & Roscoe Dash"

Lil Jon - Crunk Rock 02. "Throw It Up Pt. 2" (feat. Pastor Troy) (Co-produced by Lil Jon)
 04. "On De Grind" (feat. Damian & Stephen Marley) (Co-produced by Lil Jon)
 10. "Ms. Chocolate" (feat. R. Kelly & Mario) (Co-produced by Lil Jon)

Monica - Still Standing "How I Like It" (feat. Rocko)

OJ Da Juiceman - The Realest Nigga I Know "Pull Up"
 "He Dead"

OJ Da Juiceman - Bouldercrest Shawty "When I Get Big"
 "Kickin It"
 "Tonka"

Rocko - Wild Life18. "Lord Have Mercy"
19. "All Wayz"

Rocko - Rocko Dinero "I Salute You"
 "Goin Steady"

Snoop Dogg - More Malice 04. "House Shoes"

Usher - Versus EP 09. "Stranger"

Waka Flocka Flame - Flockaveli 05. "No Hands" (feat. Roscoe Dash & Wale)

Young Buck - Back On My Buck Shit Vol. 2: Change Of Plans 01. "Let Me Go"
 02. "Came Back"
 03. "Got Me One"
 04. "In The Clouds"
 05. "AM/FM" (featuring Lupe Fiasco)
 06. "Cleaned Off" (featuring The Outlawz)
 07. "Betta Tell Em" (featuring 8Ball)
 08. "Identify" (featuring Rocko)
 09. "U Know What It Is" (featuring MJG & 2 Chainz)
 10. "I'm Done Wit Yall"
 11. "Mark Barton"
 12. "The Blues" (featuring The Game)
 13. "Gettin It"
 14. "Lockdown"
 15. "The Streets"
 16. "Down Wit Em"
 17. "Taxin"
 18. "Round Me" (Drumma Boy featuring Young Buck & 8Ball & MJG)

Young Dolph - Welcome To Dolph World "Flavor"
 "I'm Blessed" (feat. 2 Chainz)

Yo Gotti - Cocaine Muzik 4 Both Sides Both Stories07. "Any N*gga" (feat. Yung LA, Starlito & J Futuristic)
12. "Touchdown"

Yo Gotti - Cocaine Muzik 4.5 (Da Documentary)10. "White World"

Yo Gotti - Cocaine Muzik 5 White Friday03. "It's On" (feat. Starlito & Zed Zilla)
09. "We Can Get It On" (feat. Ciara)
12. "What's Wrong With You" (feat. Starlito & Zed Zilla)

2011
2 Chainz - Codeine Cowboy: A 2 Chainz Collective "Role Model" (feat. Dolla Boy)
 "Spend It"
 "Boo" (feat. Yo Gotti)

2 Chainz - T.R.U. REALigion "Turn Up" ft. Cap-1
 "Spend It" ft. T.I.
 "Slangin' Birds" ft. Young Jeezy, Yo Gotti & Birdman
 "Addicted To Rubberbands" ft. J Hard

DJ 5150 & OJ Da Juiceman - Cook Muzik 00. "Hustle & Grind" (feat. Allie Baby)

DJ Drama - Third Power 01. "Oh My" (feat. Roscoe Dash, Fabolous & Wiz Khalifa)
 07. "Me & My Money" (feat. Gucci Mane)
 12. "Oh My" (Remix) (feat. Trey Songz, 2 Chainz & Big Sean

DJ Drama & Young Jeezy - The Real Is Back 08. "Flexin' " (feat. Fabolous & Yo Gotti)

The Game - The R.E.D. Album 00. "Pussy Fight" (feat. Ester Dean & Ray J) (Leftover track)

Gorilla Zoe - Don’t Feed da Animals prequel, Feeding Time "I Like Girls"

Gorilla Zoe - King Kong "King Kong"
 "Party Over Here"

Gucci Mane - Gucci 2 Time "Hell Yeah" (feat. Slim Dunkin)
 "Valentine Day" (feat. Bricksquad Monopoly)
 "Trick Or Treat" (feat. Bricksquad Monopoly)

Gucci Mane - The Return of Mr. Zone 6 01. "24 Hours"
 02. "Mouth Full of Gold" (feat. Birdman)
 03. "This Is What I Do" (feat. Waka Flocka Flame & OJ Da Juiceman)
 04. "Reckless" (feat. Lil Capp & Chill Will)
 07. "Better Baby"
 08. "Brinks" (feat. Master P)
 09. "Pretty Bitches" (feat. Wale)
 10. "Pancakes" (feat. Waka Flocka Flame & 8Ball)
 "Hell Yeah" (feat. Slim Dunkin)
 12. "My Year"
 13. "Trick or Treat" (feat. Slim Dunkin, Wooh Da Kid & Waka Flocka Flame)

Gucci Mane & Bricksquad Monopoly - Bricksquad Mafia "Respect My Name" (feat. Yung Joc)
 "Fly Away"
 "Mouth Full Of Gold" (feat. Birdman)

Gucci Mane - Writings On The Wall 2 09. "Translation" (featuring Cartel & Yo Gotti) 
 10. "Tax Free"
 13. "Guilty" (featuring Young Buck)
 15. "Too Turnt Up" (featuring Yelawolf)
 16. "MVP" (featuring Jagged Edge)
 18. "Recently" (featuring 50 Cent)
 19. "Yesterday"

Gucci Mane & Waka Flocka Flame - Ferrari Boyz 01. "Ferrari Boyz"
 15. "What the Hell" (feat. Rocko)

Gucci Mane & Future - Free Bricks 04. "Stevie Wonder"

Jagged Edge - The Remedy 13. "Never Meant To Lead You On"

Juicy J  - Blue Dream & Lean "Big Bank" (feat. Key) 
 "Countin Faces"

Kid Ink - Daydreamer Leftover "Turn it Out"

Nelly - O.E.M.O "Country Azz Nigga" (feat. T.I. & 2 Chainz)

Rocko
 00. "Goin' Steady (Remix)" (feat. Plies)

Shawty Lo -  B.H.F. (Bankhead Forever)15. "Bigger Picture" (ft. Future)

Starlito - Ultimate Warrior05. "Wake Up" (featuring Young Buck)
12. "Somebody Lied To Me"
13. "Ain't Worried Bout You"
16. "Do It For Me"
17. "Stuck Wit Ya" (featuring Robin Raynelle)

Starlito & Don Trip - Step Brothers Two05. "Shut Up"

Soulja Boy Tell 'Em - 1 UP "Performance"

Tinie Tempah - Happy Birthday 05. "Till I'm Gone" (Remix) (feat. Wiz Khalifa, Pusha T & Jim Jones)

Trae - Street King 01. "Strapped Up" (feat. Pyrexx)

USDA - CTE or Nothing 11. "The Lick"

Waka Flocka Flame - Salute Me or Shoot Me 3 (Hip Hops Outcast) "Ferrari Boyz" (feat. Gucci Mane)

Waka Flocka Flame & Slim Dunkin - Twin Towers 2 (No Fly Zone) 13. "Fresh As F*uck" (feat. Gucci Mane and Rocko)

Wiz Khalifa - Cabin Fever 01. "Phone Numbers" (feat. Trae & Big Sean)

Wiz Khalifa & Snoop Dogg - Mac & Devin Go to High School 01. "Smoking On" (feat. Juicy J)

Young Dolph - High Class Street Music 2: (Hustlers Paradise) 02. "Hustlers Paradise"  
 10. "Bounce" (feat. Drumma Boy)
 16. "Chances"
 17. "Long Money"

Young Jeezy - Thug Motivation 103: Hustlerz Ambition 02. "What I Do (Just Like That)"  
 17. "Lose My Mind" (feat. Plies)
 00. "Talk To Me" (feat. Eminem & Freddie Gibbs)

Yo Gotti - January 10th: The Mixtape 06. "I Got Dat Sack" (Got Dem Racks)   
 08. "Real N*ggas"
  
Young Scooter - Finessin And Flexin "Boosie"

2012
2 Chainz - Based on a T.R.U. Story 10. "Money Machine"

Chris Brown - Fortune "Oh Yeah" (ft. 2 Chainz & Snoop Dogg) (non-album single)

Gucci Mane - Trap Back 11. "Thank You"
 18. "Sometimes" (featuring Future)

Gucci Mane - I'm Up 02. "I'm Up" (featuring 2 Chainz)
 07. "Brought Out Them Racks" (featuring Big Sean)
 10. "Anytime You Ready" (featuring Birdman)
 18. "It Ain't Funny" (featuring Yo Gotti) 
 19. "Put On a Show"

Gucci Mane - Trap God 04. "Crazy" (featuring Waka Flocka Flame)

Lil Scrappy - The Grustle "Stunt On Dem Niggaz" (feat. Lil Jon)
 "Expensive"

MGK - Lace Up 04. "Lace Up" (feat. Lil Jon)

Plies - On Trial "14. No Pressure"

Shawty Lo - The Best Of Shawty Lo 04. "Atlanta GA" (feat. Ludacris, Gucci Mane and The Dream)

Wiz Khalifa - O.N.I.F.C. 03. "Bluffin" (feat. Berner)
 10. "It's Nothin" (feat. 2 Chainz)

Yo Gotti - Live from the Kitchen 10. "We Can Get it On"

Young Buck - Live Loyal Die Rich 12. "Think They Know"

Young Buck - Strictly 4 Traps N Trunks 44: Free Young Buck Edition 01. "This Shit Rough"
 02. "Re-Up" (featuring 8Ball & MJG)
 04. "Kill Something"
 08. "Peep Hole" (featuring Charlie P)
 09. "Betta Know It" (featuring B.G.)
 10. "I'ont Know" (featuring DJ Paul)
 11. "Cut You Off"

Young Buck & Tha City Paper - G.a.S – Gangsta and Street 15. "I Don't Know"

Young Dolph - A Time 2 Kill "Booked Up" (feat. Gucci Mane)

Young Dolph - Blue Magic "While I'm Rollin Up" (feat. 8 Ball & MJG) 
 "Call Me Back" 
 "Bad Girl" 
 "My Real Life" (feat. Gucci Mane)

Yung Bleu - Hello World "Go Head"

2013
2 Chainz - B.O.A.T.S. II: Me Time 09. "U Da Realest"Bow Wow - Greenlight 5 Mixtape "Heart Stop "Cash Out - Drumma Boy 2k13 Spring Bling Playlist "Round & Round"Daz Dillinger - Weed Money 00. "Love 2 Hate"DJ Paul & & Drumma Boy - Clash Of The Titans "Yeah Yeah (Intro)"
 "Clash Of The Titans" (feat. 8 Ball) 
 "End Of The Day"
 "Gimme Room"

EDIDON - O.G. Est. 1992 05. "Tonite" (featuring Young Buck, Hussein Fatal & Young Noble)

Gangsta Boo - It's Game Involved 02. "Dark Shades"
 04. "Talk Nasty" (featuring Young Buck)
 11. "Pillow Talk" (featuring 8 Ball & Maino)
 12. "Ride 4 My Boo" (featuring Trouble Andrews & Don Trip)

Gucci Mane - Trap God 2 14. "Can't Interfere Wit My Money" (ft. OG Boo Dirty)

Gucci Mane - Trap House III 07. F*ck With Me
 11. D.I.G. 
 17. Nobody

Gucci Mane - The State vs. Radric Davis II: The Caged Bird Sings 04. "Rude"

Gucci Mane & Young Scooter - Free Bricks 2 "Keep Workin"

Gucci Mane - Drumma Boy's 2K13 4th Of July Playlist "Fuck Wit Me"

Gucci Mane - Diary Of A Trap God 22. "Cold Hearted" (feat. Kevin McCall)

Lil Mister  - Hi Haters 02. "Insane"
 14. "3 Limits"

Lil Nuke  - Maurice Jackson Story14. "Yes I Do" (feat. Ca$h Out)

LoLa Monroe - Lipsticks & Pistols"Makaveli" (ft. Juicy J)

Project Pat - Cheez N Dope "Weed Smoke" 
 "Sackful" feat. Nasty Mane
 "I Ain't Seen Shit"
 "Weed Smoke (Remix)" feat. Mac Miller

Project Pat - Cheez N Dope 2"Flippin N Stackin"
"Kick Door" 
"Chiefin" (feat. Wiz Khalifa) 
"No Mirage" 
"Gettin Cash" (feat. Juicy J)
"I'm In This Club" (feat. Nasty Mane)
"Where The F*ck"

Rocko- Gift of Gab 207. One Two

Tech N9ne - Something Else13. "See Me" (featuring B.o.B. & Wiz Khalifa)
22. "Colorado"  (featuring B.o.B., Ces Cru, Krizz Kaliko, ¡Mayday!, Rittz & Stevie Stone)

Turk -  Blame It On The System "Blame It On The System" (ft. Gunplay)

Turk - Louisianimalz Vol. 1  "Dat Water" feat. Donkey Bad Ass King

Waka Flocka Flame - DuFlocka Rant: Halftime Show16. "Seen Alot" (feat. Fetti Gangand and Wooh da Kid)

Young Dolph - High Class Street Music 3 (Trappin Out A Mansion)  "Any Many Miny Moe" 
  "Get This Money" (feat. 2 Chainz) 
  "I Survived" 
  "On My Line"
  "No Sleep" 
  "Trappin Out A Mansion"

Young Dolph - South Memphis Kingpin14.  "Rich N*gga"(feat. Tim Gates)
16. "Get This Money" (feat. 2 Chainz)

Young Jeezy - ItsThaWorld 2 "Foul Play"

Zone 6 Sinister - Zone 6 Stephen King "Gunplay"

2014August Alsina - Testimony"FML" ft. Pusha T
"No Love"

Chief Keef & Gucci Mane - Big Gucci Sosa
 02. "Banger"

Chris Brown - X 00. "Wildcat"

Gangsta Boo & La Chat - Witch 03. "Til the Day"
 04. "On That" (ft. Lil Wyte)
 09. "Sweet Robbery"

Gucci Mane - Trap House 4 02. "Already"
 11. "Dope Love"

Gucci Mane - Trap God 3 05. "I Don't Do Roofs"

Gucci Mane - East Atlanta Santa 05. "Go"
 10. "Odd Ball" featuring OJ da Juiceman
 15. "One Day At a Time (Outro)"

Gucci Mane - The Return Of Mr. Perfect "Ambulance"

Kap G - Like A Mexican "Jose Got Dem Tacos" (ft. Young Jeezy)
 "We Mobbin" (ft. Young Dolph)

Ledisi - The Truth "Rock With You" (produced with Jerry 'Wonder' Duplessis)

Master P - The Gift Vol. 1: Return of The Ice Cream Man05.  "What You Thought" 
06.  "No Way"

Project Pat - Cheez N Dope 3: Street God"Pistol and a Scale"
"What You Said" (ft. Young Scooter)

Young Dolph & Young Scooter -  Road Runners Mixtape"Workin Out"

Young Dolph - High Class Street Music 4 (American Gangster) "Dollar Signs"
 "Young Nigga" (feat. Fiend)

Young Dolph - Cross Country Trappin 04. "Get This Money" (feat. 2 Chainz)

Young Jeezy - Seen It All: The Autobiography 05. "Me OK"

2015
Chris Brown & Tyga - Fan of a Fan: The Album 04. "Girl You Loud"

Chris Brown - Before the Party 16. "Freaky Sh*t"

Drumma Boy - #MyFashion02."Phamily Over Everything" (ft. Young Dolph and J Fizzle) 
07 "Gotta Do" (ft. Wave Chapelle) 
02 "Fresh As F*ck" (ft. Gucci Mane, Slim Dunkin & Rocko) 
17 "2 Tha Top" (ft. L.I. Tha Great)
12 "Fly Niggaz" (ft. 2. Playa Fly and Mac Sleepy)
13 "Fashion" (ft. Snootie Wild)

Gucci Mane - 1017 Mafia: Incarcerated "1017 Mafia" (ft. Young Thug)

Gucci Mane - Mr Clean, The Middle Man 01. "Mr Clean The Middle Man (Intro)"

Gucci Mane - Breakfast 02. "Ain't Got Time"
 03. "Tell Dem Boyz"
 11. "Losin"

Gucci Mane - Lunch 03. "Money Scheme"

Gucci Mane - Dinner 11. "Work"

Migos - Back to the Bando 00. "Bitch Dab"

Rich the Kid - Dabbin Fever 07. "Listen" (ft. Skippa Da Flippa, HoodRich Pablo Juan)

Scotty ATL - The Cooligan 05. "Cannon Ball"

Soulja Boy Tell 'Em - Promise12. "Blast Gang (Code Red)" (featuring Hurricane Chris, 50 Cent & Busta Rhymes)

Young Buck - Before The Beast 03. "Been Dat Nigga"
 06. "Push"

Young Buck  - 10 Bullets 04. "Dope Boy"

Frenchie - Long Over Due 2 13. "Greenlight" (ft. Gudda Gudda & Turk)

Young Dolph  - High Class Street Music 5 "What I Gotta Do"
 "Forever"
 "Make The World Go Round"
 "All Mine"

Young Dolph - South Memphis Kingpin 09. "Get Blow'd" 
 14. "Rich Nigga" (ft. Tim Gates)
 16. "Get This Money" (ft. 2 Chainz)

SD - Life Of A Savage 4 05. "Blessed"

Young Dolph - 16 Zips 01. "Boyz In Da Hood" 
 11. "Everyday 420"
 13. "Addicted "(ft. Jadakiss)

Hurricane Chris - Hurricane Season 09. "To The Money"

  Jucee Froot - Diamond In The Rough 03. "Petty MFS (Remix)"

J. Money - Sauce 4 Sale"Come On"

 JMoney Trulla - Trulla World 2 07. "Young Nigga Sht" (ft. Snootie Wild & Zed Zilla)

Scott King
"FTS"

2016
KiD - All Black Winter01. "King In Demand"

Lil Reese - 300 Degrees01. "Sum New" ( produced with Suber )

MoneyBaggYo - Federal Reloaded22. "Animals" (feat. Y.Gizzle & Fengshui)

Project Pat - Street God 207. "Bag" (ft. King Ray)

Yo Gotti - The Art of Hustle11. "Imagine Dat"

Ace Boogie - Exit 814. "Strip"

Gucci Mane - Everybody Looking13. "All My Children"

Bay Bay The Ambassador 
00. "Trap Holiday"  (ft. Young Greatness)

SwayvoMetro 
00. "Fuego" (ft. Huncho Jones)

iHateFreco - I Hate Freco Reloaded05. "About A Min" (ft. Nyne O'Nyne)

Gucci Mane - Woptober12. Out the Zoo

Don Trip - Guerrilla"Like Me" ( produced with DP Beatz and Suber )

Cool Courtney - The Mud Mixtape"OG Speaks / The Mud"

Curren$y - Andretti 12/3006. "There Go The Man" (ft. Corner Boy P)

Young Dolph - Bosses & Shooters03. "Bosses & Shooters" (ft. Jay Fizzle and Bino Brown)

Young Dolph - King of Memphis04. "Both Ways"

2017
Young Dolph - Bulletproof05. "That's How I Feel" (ft. Gucci Mane)

Young Dolph - Thinking Out Loud10. "While U Here"

Young Dolph - Gelato07. "Yeezy"

Yo Gotti - I Still Am12. "Don't Wanna Go Back"

Chris Brown & Ray J - Burn My Name09. "Famous"

Scotty ATL & Drumma Boy - Who Shot Cupid01. "Ball Out" (ft. Carlon Syl)
03. "Marry Me" (Wayyy Betta)
04. "Pull Up" (ft. Que)
05. "Kudos"
06. "I Dream" (ft. Young Greatness)
07. "Loyal"
08. "Sucka Free"
09. "No Love In February" (Produced With Bryan Michael Cox)

Scotty ATL - Smoking On My Own Strain04. "Marry Me" (Wayyy Betta)
06. "Senorita" (ft. Kap G)
 
Young Greatness - Bloody Summer01. "Drugs And Money"
06. "Pull Up"
10. "14U"

Young Greatness
00. We "Rollin"

Eastside Jody - Get Rich Or Die Trappin08. "Hands On" (ft. Trick Daddy)
13. "Pictures"
17. "F*ck It Up"

Doe Boy - Get Rich Or Die Trappin 
04. "Pack Hit" (ft. Trick Daddy)

2018
YoungBoy Never Broke Again - Until Death Call My Name06. "We Poppin" (ft. Birdman)

Too Short - The Pimp Tape03. "Tables" (ft. 2 Chainz, Snoop Dogg)
04. "Ain't My Girfriend" (ft. Ty Dolla $ign, French Montana, Joyner Lucas, Jeremih)

Lil' Keke - Slfmade II11. "Slab on Butter" (ft. Big Pokey, Jack Freeman, Propain)

2020
K Michelle - All Monsters Are Human02. "That Game"

Young Dolph - Rich Slave11. "Rich Slave"

Kevin Gates
00. "Give It All I Got"

2021
Young Buck - Back On My Buck Shit Vol. 300. Produced All Tracks

2022
Young Dolph - Paper Route Frank08. "Smoke My Weed"
TBADJ Drama - Quality Street Music 2 "4 What" feat. Young Jeezy, Yo Gotti & Juicy J

Juelz Santana - Born to Lose, Built to Win 00. "Home Run" (feat. Lil Wayne)

Project Pat - Cheez N Dope 4"Mack Shyt" (ft. Fat Trel and Big Trill)

Others4 Mill "Executively Thuggin"47 Mobb - It Iz What It Iz "What It's Gone B" (feat. Yung Kee)9th Ward "Supermodel"

Allie Baby - Study Hall "Lacing" 
 "New Year" 
 "Bonita" 
 "Wtl" 
 "Bounce That Ass" 
 "Stompng Ground "
 "Sarah Lee" 
 "Cruisin"
 "Catch Me" 
 "Made Bitches" 
 "Ghetto" 
 "Mod" 
 "He Got It"
 "Da Stamp"Alley Boy "Ima Smash It" (feat. Gucci Mane)Bettie Grind "Dammit I'm Flllyyyy"
 "Hello"Big HoodBoss "Str8 DumB" (feat. Slim Thug)
 "I Got Action" feat. 2 Chainz)
 "How I Rock" ft. Rocko & Young Chase

Billy Blue
 "Official" (feat. Bobby Valentino)Bohagon - The Victory Lap "Go Blind"Busta Rhymes "Pewwn" (feat. Spliff Star)Chris Brown - Forward Fortune (In My Zone 2.5) Mixtape "One More Time"  
 "Fuck The City Up"  
 "See Through" 
 "Drop It" ft. OHB 
 "How I Feel"CyHi Da Prynce 
"Sideways"Criminal Mane - Welcome To My City 2 "TN Boyz" (feat. Young Buck & Don Trip)

DJ JSess  -  Purple Diesel 4Bring Them Thangs"  (ft. Gucci Mane, Bankroll Fresh & Chief Keef) (prod with Zaytoven)Don Trip "Green & Purple" (feat. Young Dolph)Eastside Jody - I Pledge Allegiance To Tha Trap "Known In The Hood"
 "Counterfeit"
 "All I Need"
 "Get Rich"
 "Everywhere"
 "Draw Da Line"
 "Money"
 "Only Understand Money"
 "Breakin Down Bricks"
 "Espanol"

Ebony Love
 "She Me"

Euro Mil -  Strictly 4 The Traps N Trunks 40 (Hosted By Jackie Chain) "Trophies" ft. Young Dolph

Flo Rida
 Keep It Pouring

Future - Future Hendrix Usual (What I Usually Do)

Gangsta Blac - Return of the Gangsta "Yea Boi"

Gloss Da Boss – Gloss World (The Evolution) "Bosses Code"Goapele "Right Here"

Gucci Mane - Gucci La Flare "Mo Money"

Gucci Mane
 "East Atlanta Memphis" (feat. Yo Gotti, Juicy J, Project Pat, & Kingpin Skinny Pimp)
 "It's Over"
 "30 Years 30 Million"
 "Shopaholic"
 "Slumber Party"
 "2 Timez" (feat. Wiz Khalifa)
 "Burr Burr" (feat. Soulja Boy Tell 'Em & Yo Gotti)
 "Payday" (feat. Game)
 "Still Ain't Tired"
 "MVP" (feat. Jagged Edge)
 "Stevie Wonder" (feat. Future)

Gyft
 "In His Eyes"
 "Party Animal"

HK - Lights Camera Jackin "Check Out My Fresh"
 "Move"
 "I Like It"
 "Above The Clouds"
 "I Gets It In"
 "Gangsta"
 "In My Hood"
 "Watch Me Jack"
 "The Way I Do It"
 "Do It Big"
 "Pop Off"

HK
"So Long" (feat. Young Buck)

J. Futuristic - Whats On My Mind Pt. 1 "Sensei"

J. Futuristic - Mr. Futuristic 2 (Da Return Of Mr. Miyagi) "Intro"
 "Baby I Dont"
 "Classic"
 "Money Dont Make Me"
 "Whats On My Mind"
 "Baow Baow"
 "Auto Pilot"
 "All About My Cash"
 "Lego" (feat. Young Buck)
 "OK Cool"
 "Blowing Money"
 "Can't Come Down"JBar "Call Me" (feat. Gangsta Boo)J Love "Rice Krispy"

Jody Breeze
 "Do Ya Thing"

K. Michelle - Pain Medicine "Self Made" (feat. Trina)

Kandi Gurl
 "Fly Above"
 "Trade Him In" (feat. Gucci Mane)

KaliRaps - Mr. Misunderstood
 "Your Too Good"

Killa Kyleon - Dj Zazu & Jonay Presents Dat Duffy Vol. 1 hosted By Lex Luger & Waka Flocka
"Dopeboy Rich"

King D - Roc Town Massacre "Dont Love These Hoes"Kinfolk Thugs "No Doubt" (feat. Kristyle)
 "She Got" (feat. Young Buck, PlayaFly & GK)Kristyle - Young and Paid "Country Boy" ft. (Kinfolk Thugs)

La Chat - Krumbz 2 Brickz "Get Doe" (feat. Gucci Mane & Allstar)
 "Don't Look At Me" (feat. Gangsta Boo)
 "Back 2 Da Block"

Lil Twist - Best Teen Rapper Alive "Drumma On The Beat"

Lloyd
 "Twerk Off" (feat. Juicy J)
 "Be the One" ft. Trey Songz & Young Jeezy

Kevin Gates - "Bout Dat Life"Not Really"

Marsha Ambrosius
 "I Wanna"

Miss B -  T.Brewer DJ Krill FREE GAS: Last Call for Alcohol "Take A Step Back"Mista Mac - Dj Zazu & Jonay Presents Dat Duffy Vol. 1 hosted By Lex Luger & Waka Flocka "Incredible"

Money Mo
 "I Get Excited (feat. Rick Ross, Charlie Hustle, & Rich Boy)

Mr.PCP
 "Straight To Tha Money"

Musiq Soulchild
 "Waiting Still"

OG Boo Dirty - Born A Soldier, Die A Vet "True Religion" (feat. 2 Chainz)

OJ Da Juiceman
 "Diamond Chains"
 "I Got Juice" (feat. Verse Simmons)
 "Keep It Moving" (feat. Allie Baby)

One Chance - One Chance "U Can't" (feat. Yung Joc)

P2TheLA - N.W.A. "Hunnit"
 "Like This"
 "Eazy E"
 "Coordinate"
 "Lil' Homie"
 "Back to the Future"
 "HBO"
 "Joe Montana"

Playaz Circle
 "Issues" (feat. Young Buck)

Plies - Purple Heart "Gossip"

Plies
 "Long Way"

Rich Boy
 "It's Over"
 "Come & Get Me"
 "Fuck Boy" (feat. Gangsta Boo)

Rico Love - The Inauguration Mixtape "I'm A Pimp" (feat. Bohagon & Jody Breeze)

Roccett
 "You Ani't Heard"

Slick Pulla
 "Talk Real Slick"

Slim Polk
 "Hood Trak"

Slim the Snapbacker
 "Party Party"
 "Shine"

Slim Thug - Still Like A Boss
 "Gun Play" (feat. Killa Kyleon)

Spodee - The BID10. "Top"

The Office
 "Fly Away" (Chris Brown Demo)

T-Pain
 "Drop It" (ft. Jeff Johnson)

Trey Songz
 "Changes" 
 "Real Freak"

Vic Damone
 "Popppin' Rubberbands" (feat. Gucci Mane & Yo Gotti)
 "Check My Swag" (feat. Lil' Boosie)

Young Bleu
 "Do What I Wanna"

Young Buck
 "Lets Do It"
 "My Campaign"
 "Get Back"
 "You Better Know It"
 "Ain't Slept In Days" (featuring Ryan Toby)

Young D Da Boss
 "Like I'm Suppose To Do" (feat. Yung Ralph)

Young Dolph -  Drumma Boy 2k13 Spring Bling Playlist
 "Get Blowd"

Young Woo
 "Paparazzi"

Yung Berg
 "Get It Good"
 "FishBowl"
 "One Call Away"
 "Bitch Please" (feat. Lil Wayne & Brisco)
 "You Ain't"

Yung Chase
 "Mann I'm About" ft. (Paul Wall & Slim Thug)

Yung D - At The Crib 23
 "They Don't Like That"

Yung Fresh
 "Get Doe"

Yung Joc - Swag Team Mafia "Wowzers"

Yung Joc - Grind Flu "Birds" (feat. Nicki Minaj, Gucci Mane & OJ Da Juiceman)

Yung Redd - Fast Money Underground Vol. 1''
 "Get This Money"

Credited Singles
2007
"White Girl" (USDA)
"Umma Do Me" (Rocko)
"Shawty" (Plies featuring T-Pain)
2008
"What Up, What's Haapnin" (T.I.)
"Put On" (Young Jeezy featuring Kanye West)
"I'm Da Man" (Plies featuring Trey Songz)
"Tomorrow" (Rocko)
"Here I Am" (Rick Ross featuring Nelly & Avery Storm)
2009
"Day Dreaming" (DJ Drama featuring Akon, Snoop Dogg & T.I.)
"Plenty Money" (Plies)
"Echo" (Gorilla Zoe)
"Money to Blow"(Birdman featuring Drake & Lil Wayne)
2010
"Beat It Up" (Gucci Mane featuring Trey Songz)
"Weirdo" (Gucci Mane)
"Worst Enemy" (Gucci Mane)
"Just Like That" (Bun B featuring Young Jeezy)
"Lose My Mind" (Young Jeezy featuring Plies)
"Ms. Chocolate" (Lil Jon featuring R. Kelly & Mario and Claude Kelly)
"No Hands" (Waka Flocka Flame featuring Roscoe Dash & Wale)
"Ten Toes Down" (8Ball & MJG featuring Lil Boosie)
2011
"Goin Steady" (Rocko)
"Mouth Full Of Gold" (Gucci Mane featuring Birdman)
"24 Hours" (Gucci Mane)
"This Is What I Do" (Gucci Mane featuring Waka Flocka Flame & OJ Da Juiceman)
"Oh My" (DJ Drama featuring Fabolous, Wiz Khalifa & Roscoe Dash)
"Life Goes On" (8Ball & MJG featuring Slim Thug)
"We Can Get It On" (Yo Gotti featuring Ciara)
"Country Azz Nigga" (Nelly featuring T.I. & 2 Chainz)
"Smokin' On" (Wiz Khalifa & Snoop Dogg featuring Juicy J)
"Boo" (2 Chainz featuring Yo Gotti)
"Lose My Mind" (Jeezy featuring Plies)
2012
"Spend It" (2 Chainz)
"It's Nothin"  (Wiz Khalifa featuring (2 Chainz)
2013
"D.I.G." (Gucci Mane)
2014
"No Love" (August Alsina featuring Nicki Minaj)
"Me Ok" (Jeezy)
2015
"Look At My Dab" (Migos)
2016
"Animals" (Moneybagg Yo featuring Y Gizzle & Fengshui)
2017
"That's How I Feel" (Young Dolph featuring Gucci Mane)
"While U Here" (Young Dolph)
2018
"We Poppin'" (NBA Youngboy featuring Birdman)

References

 
Hip hop discographies
Production discographies